The Tempest is an opera in three acts by the American composer Lee Hoiby to a libretto by Mark Shulgasser adapted from Shakespeare's The Tempest. It was first performed in 1986 by the Des Moines Metro Opera.

Recording
The Tempest – Robert Balonek (baritone), Molly Davey (soprano), Catherine Webber (soprano), Joshua Benevento (tenor), Anthony Caputo (tenor), Julian Whitley (tenor), Rasdia Wilmot (alto), Jeffrey Taveras (vocals), JungBum Heo (vocals), Derek Greten-Harrison (counter-tenor), Said Pressley (vocals), D'ana Lombard (vocals), Diana Wangerin (vocals), Ilene Pabon (vocals), Purchase Symphony Orchestra, Hugh Murphy. Purchase Opera, Director Jacque Trussel. Albany Records 2009

References

1986 operas
Operas
Operas by Lee Hoiby
Operas based on The Tempest
English-language operas